"Za Ukrainu" (or "For Ukraine") is a Ukrainian patriotic song. In 1991 was a candidate to be adopted as the anthem of Ukraine.

Background
The song was written by Mykola Voronyi, a prominent Ukrainian poet, civil activist, politician, and one of the founders of the Central Rada. Voronyi was from a former serf-peasant family and was eventually murdered by the Soviet regime as a socially dangerous element. He was posthumously rehabilitated by the Kirovohrad Oblast Court.

Two similar melodies on a lyrics by Mykola Voronyi "For Ukraine!" were created by Lviv composers Bohdan Vahnyanin (1886-1940) and Yaroslav Yaroslavenko (1880-1958). The melody performed nowadays slightly differs from both of them.

The song later in the beginning of 1990's was popularized by the Ukrainian folk-band Sokoly led by Ivan Matsyalko from Lviv Oblast. The song also is considered as the alternative Ukrainian anthem, unofficially. It was popular among the Ukrainian Army in the struggle against the Soviets.

pre-2003 lyrics

See also
 National Anthem of Ukraine
 Mykola Voronyi

References

External links

Lyrics 
Lyrics and guitar's notes 

Ukrainian patriotic songs